Sallie Foley is a social worker and social work academic specialising in sex therapy, sexual health and the consequences of genital surgery on children.

Biography 
Foley is the director of the University of Michigan Sexual Health Certificate Program for the center for sexual health/University of Michigan Health System/Department of Social Work and the Graduate School of Social Work.  She is also the former director of the center for sexual health at University of Michigan Health System/Department of Social Work.  She is an AASECT certified sex therapist, educator, supervisor and diplomate of sex therapy.  She has been on the faculty at the Graduate School of Social Work since 1981. Her clinical work and teaching address issues of psychological development, the treatment of sexual difficulties, and therapies for bereavement and traumatic loss. She is on the editorial board of the American Journal of Sexuality Education. Among other awards, she is the 2004 recipient of the UMHS Beverly Jean Howard award for Excellence in Social Work. Foley is a regular lecturer in the University of Michigan Medical School and Department of Psychiatry.  Her current research projects include sexual health concerns and information needs of cancer patients, research providing sex therapy interventions for cancer patients, and the creation of a research database at the center for sexual health.

Foley has a private practice in psychotherapy and consultation in Ann Arbor, Michigan. Foley has written chapters and articles about the treatment of sexual difficulties and co-authored the publicly acclaimed Sex Matters for Women: A complete guide to taking care of your sexual self now in its 2nd edition. She also wrote Modern Love: A no-nonsense guide to a life of passion (AARP/Sterling, 2006) based on her “Modern Love” column in AARP The Magazine. She lectures nationally and internationally in the areas of grief, trauma and human sexuality.

Publications 
1984 Going to the edge
1994 Sexual dysfunction : neurologic, urologic, and gynecologic aspects (with Richard Lechtenberg, Dana A Ohl and Carolyn Marie Johnston) 
2005 Sex & love for grownups : a no-nonsense guide to a life of passion  (published in paperback in 2006 as Modern love : a no-nonsense guide to a life of passion 
2012 Sex matters for women : a complete guide to taking care of your sexual self (with Sally A Kope and Dennis P Sugrue)

References

External links
Official website

Living people
University of Michigan faculty
Year of birth missing (living people)
American social workers